An oxgang or bovate is an old land measurement formerly used in Scotland and England as early as the 16th century sometimes referred to as an oxgait. It averaged around 20 English acres, but was based on land fertility and cultivation, and so could be as low as 15.

An oxgang is also known as a bovate, from bovāta, a Medieval Latinisation of the word, derived from the Latin bōs, meaning "ox, bullock or cow". Oxen, through the Scottish Gaelic word damh or dabh, also provided the root of the land measurement 'daugh'.

Skene in Celtic Scotland says:
 "in the eastern district there is a uniform system of land denomination consisting of 'dabhachs', 'ploughgates' and 'oxgangs', each 'dabhach' consisting of four 'ploughgates' and each 'ploughgate' containing eight 'oxgangs'.

"As soon as we cross the great chain of mountains [the Grampian Mountains] separating the eastern from the western waters, we find a different system equally uniform. The 'ploughgates' and 'oxgangs' disappear, and in their place we find 'dabhachs' and 'pennylands'. The portion of land termed a 'dabhach' is here also called a 'tirung' or 'ounceland', and each 'dabhach' contains 20 pennylands."

In Scotland, oxgang occurs in Oxgangs, a southern suburb of Edinburgh, and in Oxgang, an area of the town of Kirkintilloch.

Usage in England
The oxgang represented the amount of land which could be ploughed using one ox, in a single annual season. As land was normally ploughed by a team of eight oxen, an oxgang was thus one eighth the size of a ploughland or carucate. Although these areas were not fixed in size and varied from one village to another, an oxgang averaged , and a ploughland or carucate . However, in the rest of England a parallel system was used, from which the Danelaw system of carucates and bovates seen in Domesday Book was derived. There, the virgate represented land which could be ploughed by a pair of oxen, and so amounted to two oxgangs or bovates, and was a quarter of a hide, the hide and the carucate being effectively synonymous.

A peasant occupying or working an oxgang or bovate might be known as a "" or "".

See also
 Obsolete Scottish units of measurement
 In the East of Scotland:
 Rood
 Scottish acre = 4 roods
 Oxgang (Damh-imir) = the area an ox could plough in a single annual season (around 20 acres)
 Ploughgate (?) = 8 oxgangs
 Daugh (Dabhach) = 4 ploughgates
 In the West of Scotland:
 Groatland - (Còta bàn) = basic unit
 Pennyland (Peighinn) = 2 groatlands
 Quarterland (Ceathramh) = 4 pennylands (8 groatlands)
 Ounceland (Tir-unga) = 4 quarterlands (32 groatlands)
 Markland (Marg-fhearann) = 8 Ouncelands (varied)

References

 ((Dabhach) with corrections and additions)

External links 
 Oxgang: Wiktionary
 Carucate: Wiktionary
 Wapentake: Wiktionary

Obsolete Scottish units of measurement
Obsolete units of measurement
Units of area
Early Modern Scotland
Early Modern England